Jazbina is a small settlement in the Municipality of Šmarje pri Jelšah in the traditional region of Styria in eastern Slovenia. The area is part of the Savinja Statistical Region.

References

External links
Jazbina at Geopedia

Populated places in the Municipality of Šmarje pri Jelšah